South Weber is a city on the northeastern edge of Davis County, Utah, United States. It is part of the Ogden–Clearfield, Utah Metropolitan Statistical Area. The population was 6,051 at the 2010 census, with an estimated population of 7,518 in 2018.

History
South Weber was the site of the Morrisite War. On June 13, 1862, an estimated 500-man army perched cannons atop the bluffs on the south side of the city, aimed at Joseph Morris. The war lasted three days, and ultimately resulted in the death of Joseph Morris, John Banks, and a few others. Upon seeing their leaders dead, the remainder of the Morrisites surrendered.

South Weber is also known for a week of Bigfoot sightings in February 1980. For one week, residents reported signs of the legendary Sasquatch. At the time, multiple residents claimed to have seen the creature while feeding horses, smelled foul "bigfoot" odors, and found large patches of strange fur throughout the small community. Although no animal was ever found, the legend lives on.

Business Week magazine named South Weber the sixth best suburb in the country in 2009.

Geography

South Weber is located in northeastern Davis County, bordered to the north by the Weber County line. Neighboring cities are Uintah to the north Washington Terrace and Riverdale to the northwest, and Layton to the south. Hill Air Force Base borders the southwest side of the city.

The Weber River forms most of the northern boundary of the city.

Although located in Davis County, the city's streets follow the street grid of Weber County to the north (which is based upon the meridians of Ogden).

Demographics

As of the census of 2010, there were 6,051 people, 1,707 households, and 1,508 families residing in the city. The racial makeup of the city was 95.5% White, 0.4% African American, 0.2% Native American, 0.5% Asian, 0.2% Pacific Islander, 1.1% from other races, and 2.1% from two or more races. Hispanic or Latino of any race were 4.3% of the population.

There were 1,707 households, out of which 50.3% had children under the age of 18 living with them, 80.7% were married couples living together, 5.5% had a female householder with no husband present, and 11.7% were non-families. 9.1% of all households were made up of individuals, and 2.7% had someone living alone who was 65 years of age or older. The average household size was 3.54 and the average family size was 3.81.

In the city, the population was spread out, with 365% under the age of 18, and 6.0% who were 65 years of age or older. The median age was 29.5 years. For every 100 females, there were 102.4 males.

See also

 List of cities and towns in Utah

References

External links

 

Cities in Davis County, Utah
Cities in Utah
Ogden–Clearfield metropolitan area
Populated places established in 1851
1851 establishments in Utah Territory